John O'Kane Murray (December 12, 1847 – July 30, 1885) was a physician and author.  He was born in County Antrim, Ireland, in 1847. He came with his family to the United States in 1856.  He attended St. John's College (now Fordham University), and became a physician.  Murray wrote books on church history, hagiography, Irish poetry, English literature, and history.  He died in Chicago in 1885.

References

Who Was Who in America, Historical Volume 1607-1896.  Chicago: Quincy Who's Who, 1963.

1847 births
1885 deaths
Irish writers
19th-century Irish people
People from County Antrim
Fordham University alumni
Irish emigrants to the United States (before 1923)